Jim Sanderson (born c. 1939) is a former American football coach. He served as the head football coach at California Polytechnic State University in San Luis Obispo, California from 1982 to 1986, compiling a record of 26–27. Sanderson worked a defensive assistant at Cal Poly before being named the head coach.

Head coaching record

References

Year of birth missing (living people)
Living people
Cal Poly Mustangs football coaches